The 3rd Skinner's Horse was a cavalry regiment of the British Indian Army.  It was originally raised at Hansi by Lt.-Col. James Skinner as the 2nd Regiment of Skinner's Horse in 1814, the various changes and amalgamations are listed below.

1814 2nd Regiment of Skinner's Horse
1821 Baddeley's Frontier Horse
1823 4th (Baddeley's) Local Horse
1840 4th Irregular Cavalry
1861 3rd Regiment of Bengal Cavalry
1901 3rd Bengal Cavalry (Skinner's Horse)
1903 3rd Skinner's Horse.
1921 1st/3rd Skinner's Horse.
1922 1st Duke of York's Own Skinner's Horse

1914-21
3rd Skinner's Horse was sent to the Western Front, France, with the 7th (Meerut) Cavalry Brigade in late 1914, remaining there until their transfer back to India in 1916, then they were posted to the Loralai for service on the North West Frontier. They saw action during the Third Anglo-Afghan War of 1919.

Claude Stokes, intelligence officer for the Dunsterforce, was an officer with the 3rd Skinner's Horse.

It amalgamated with the 1st Duke of York's Own Lancers Skinner's Horse at Sialkot in June 1921 and so ceased to have a separate identity, its traditions and honours being carried forward by the new regiment.

References
 Kempton, C (1996). A Register of Titles of the Units of the H.E.I.C. & Indian Armies 1666-1947. Bristol: British Empire & Commonwealth Museum. 
 Daniels, Major A. M. (1925) The History of Skinner's Horse.

Military units and formations established in 1814
British Indian Army cavalry regiments
Honourable East India Company regiments
Indian World War I regiments
1814 establishments in British India